Idrissa Laouali (born September 11, 1979 in Niger) was a Nigerien football midfielder. His nickname is Pele.

Career

He previously played for Burkinabe club Rail Club du Kadiogo and AS-FNIS from Niger. He played with AS-FNIS on African Club Competitions 2003.

International career

Idrissa is a member and captain  of the Niger national football team.

References

External links
 
 Footballmercato

1979 births
Living people
Nigerien footballers
Niger international footballers
Sahel SC players
Association football forwards
Expatriate footballers in Burkina Faso
Rail Club du Kadiogo players
Nigerien expatriate sportspeople in Burkina Faso
ASFA Yennenga players
Expatriate footballers in Gabon
AS Mangasport players
2011 African Nations Championship players
2012 Africa Cup of Nations players
2013 Africa Cup of Nations players
People from Maradi Region
AS FAN players
Nigerien expatriate sportspeople in Gabon
Niger A' international footballers